Scheiber is a surname, and may refer to:

 Anne Scheiber (1903/04–1995), American business woman
 Frederick Scheiber, American politician
 Florian Scheiber (born 1987), Austrian skier 
 Hugo Scheiber (1873–1950), Hungarian painter
 Maria Scheiber (born 1961), Austrian politician
 Mario Scheiber (born 1983), Austrian skier
 Matthias Scheiber (born 1946), Austrian politician
 Noam Scheiber, editor for The New Republic
 Peter Scheiber, (born 1935), American inventor of Quadraphonic sound
 Sándor Scheiber (or Alexander Scheiber) (1913–1985), Hungarian rabbi and Jewish scholar

Variant surnames 
 Slavko Šajber (1929–2003), Croatian politician, football official and former president of the Football Association of Yugoslavia